Robert Adair Payne (22 October 1811 – date of death unknown) was an English first-class cricketer.

The son of William Payne, he was born in October 1811 at Clifton, Bristol. He was educated at Harrow School, before going up to Oriel College, Oxford. While studying at Oxford, he played first-class cricket for Oxford University in 1832, making two appearances against the Marylebone Cricket Club at Oxford and Lord's. His score of 52 at Oxford was the second half century made in first-class cricket for Oxford University, following Rice Price's 71 against Cambridge in Oxford's inaugural first-class match in 1827.

References

External links

1811 births
Date of death unknown
People from Clifton, Bristol
People educated at Harrow School
Alumni of Oriel College, Oxford
English cricketers
Oxford University cricketers